Asami Kobayashi (born 29 November 1953), stage name of Toshiko Tanabe, is a Japanese singer, actress and model.

Life and career 
Born in Kōriyama, Kobayashi started her career as an idol while still at high school; she made her record debut in 1972 with "Hatsukoi no merodī" (初恋のメロディー; "Melody of First Love"), which reached the 18th position on the Oricon Singles Chart. She eventually had her breakout in the late 1970s as a model and an actress for commercials of major brands such as Shiseido and Parco.

Ueda's major hit was the 1984 song "Amaoto wa Chopin no Shirabe" (雨音はショパンの調べ; "The Sound of Rain is Chopin's Music"), a cover of Gazebo's "I Like Chopin" with Japanese lyrics by Yumi Matsutoya; the song peaked at the top of the Oricon Singles Chart for three weeks.  She also worked as an actress in TV dramas and films. In 1991, she married and retired from show business to focus on her family. She made her official comeback in 2016, posing on the cover of the magazine Kunel. In 2020, she was the subject of a biography, Kobayashi Asami ― dai ni-maku (小林麻美―第二幕; "Kobayashi Mami ― The Second Act"), written by Hiroshi Nobue.

References

External links

1953 births
Living people
People from Kōriyama
Japanese pop singers 
Japanese film actresses
Japanese television actresses
Japanese female models